Saregama may refer to:

 Sa Re Ga Ma, an Indian musical reality TV game show
 Sa Re Ga Ma Pa Challenge 2007, a musical program
 Saregama Ltd, an Indian music label and  content producer for Indian television